Monsalve is a Spanish surname. Notable people with the name include:
 Adriana Monsalve, Sports journalist
 David Monsalve, Canadian football player
 Giancarlo Monsalve, Chilean tenor
 Hussein Monsalve, Venezuelan cyclist
 Jonathan Monsalve, Venezuelan cyclist
 José Manuel Monsalve, Brazilian basketball coach
 Paulino Monsalve, Spanish hockey player